Prouville is a commune in the Somme department in Hauts-de-France in northern France.

Geography
It is surrounded by the communes Beaumetz, Agenville and Bernaville.

Population

See also
Communes of the Somme department

References

Communes of Somme (department)